Saint-Dominique Church is a Roman Catholic church in Quebec City, Quebec, Canada. It was constructed between 1929 and 1930. In 2014, the church was added to the Répertoire du patrimoine culturel du Québec.

History
The Dominicans arrived in Quebec City in 1906. They worked out of the Chapel of St. Dominic. In 1925, after nearly twenty years there, the chapel became home to a parish.

After a few years, the congregation became too large for the chapel, so St. Dominic's Church was built to replace the chapel. It was built in the style of English Gothic Revival and the first Mass was celebrated in the church at 25 December 1930.

Gallery

See also
 Saint-Jean-Baptiste Church (Quebec City)

References

Further reading

External links

Roman Catholic churches in Quebec City
Roman Catholic churches completed in 1930
Heritage buildings of Quebec
Gothic Revival church buildings in Canada
Gothic Revival architecture in Quebec City
20th-century Roman Catholic church buildings in Canada